Sociedad Deportiva Tenisca is a Spanish football team club from the city of Santa Cruz de La Palma, on the island of La Palma (Canary Islands). It was founded in 1922 and currently plays in Tercera División RFEF – Group 12, holding home games at Estadio Virgen de las Nieves, with a 5,500-seat capacity.

History
Tenisca is the oldest club the island of La Palma that still exists. It is also the club with more consecutive seasons in Tercera División – Group 12 the only one in Spain that played every season in the last format of Tercera División.

Its rivalry with CD Mensajero is the most important derby of the island of La Palma. One of these games, played in 1983, was considered one of the most violents in the history of Spanish football.

In the 2016–17 season the club finished 11th in the Tercera División, Group 12.

Season to season

42 seasons in Tercera División
1 season in Tercera División RFEF

Club Details

 Seasons in Segunda División B: 0.
 Seasons in Tercera Division: 41.
 Better position in League: 1st (1996–97 and 2004–05).
 Worse position in League: 16th (1979–80, 2002–03 and 2018–19).
 Matches played in league: 1152.
 Points earned in league: 1493.
 League games won: 487.
 Tied for league games: 289.
 League matches lost: 376.
 Goals scored in league: 1689.
 Goals against in league: 1410.
 Historical classification in Tercera Division:
 By number of seasons: 103 º (1 º de Canarias).
 By number of points: 56 º (2 º de Canarias).
 Major goals obtained:
 At home: S.D. 8-0 Tenisca U.D. Gáldar (1992–93) and S.D. 8-0 Tenisca C.D. La Oliva (2004–05).
 Outside: At. Step 1-5 S.D. Tenisca (1996–97).
 Major goals fitted:
 At home: S.D. 1-6 Tenisca U.D. Las Palmas At. (1983–84).
 Outside: C.D. Leganés 9-2 S.D. Tenisca (1979–80).
 Promotions for promotion to Segunda División B played: 9 (1993–94, 1996–97, 2000–01, 2003–04, 2004–05, 2008–09, 2011–12, 2015–16 and 2019–20).
 Promotions for promotion to Segunda División B collected: 0.
 Participations in the Cup: 7 (1979–80, 1982–83, 1983–84, 1986–87, 1987–88, 2005–06 and 2009–10).
 RFEF Cup Appearances (National Phase): 2 (2002–03, 2009–10)
 Shares in the League Cup Third Division: 1 (1982–83)

Current squad

Local derbies
Tenisca's most passionate rivalry is with CD Mensajero. This started from the 20s to the present.

Since the reorganisation of the fourth division in 1977, the clubs have met in the league on 37 occasions, with twelve wins for Tenisca and eight wins for Mensajero and 17 draws.

References

External links
Futbolme team profile 
Unofficial blog 
Official page 
Estadios de España 

Football clubs in the Canary Islands
Sport in La Palma
Association football clubs established in 1922
1922 establishments in Spain